Augustin, King of Kung-Fu is a 1999 film, directed by Anne Fontaine.

Cast and roles
Jean-Chrétien Sibertin-Blanc as Augustin, an actor playing in minor roles. He is passionate about kung fu and has self-studied by watching movies and practicing in his small apartment
Maggie Cheung as Ling, an acupuncture doctor. She studied in Guangzhou and has been living with her cousins in Paris for a year and a half
Darry Cowl as René
Bernard Campan as Boutinot
Paulette Dubost as Madame Haton, the old neighbor
Pascal Bonitzer as The movie director
Ming Shan as Kung-fu teacher
Patricia Dinev as Chantal
Fanny Ardant as herself
Anne-Laure Meury as Prostitute
Ham-Chau Luong as Kung-fu master in the dream
Winston Ong as Monsieur Li
Reinaldo Wong as The hotel receptionist
Marc Hoang as Ballet soloist
André Dussollier as himself

Filming locations
Paris, mainly in the Chinatown of the 13th arrondissement
Beijing

References

External links

1999 films
French comedy films
1999 comedy films
Films directed by Anne Fontaine
1990s French films